Theodoros Griniazakis (born 17 January 1968) is a Greek swimmer. He competed in two events at the 1988 Summer Olympics.

References

1968 births
Living people
Greek male swimmers
Olympic swimmers of Greece
Swimmers at the 1988 Summer Olympics
Place of birth missing (living people)